The Crime and the Criminal is a 1912 Australian silent film directed by Alfred Rolfe. It features the same railway collision as the climax in Do Men Love Women? (1912) which had come out only a few weeks prior. However the plots of the movies are different.

The film was set in Sydney and the Kimberley.

It is considered a lost film.

References

External links

The Crime and the Criminal at AustLit

Australian black-and-white films
Australian silent feature films
Lost Australian films
Films directed by Alfred Rolfe